Tristan Lake Leabu  (born August 19, 1999) is an American actor and musician. From 2016 to 2020, he portrayed the role of Reed Hellstrom on The Young and the Restless.

Life and career
Leabu was born in Los Angeles, California, to Jeff Leabu, an artist and model of Romanian and Scandinavian descent, and Jennifer Leabu. He has a younger sister, Aria Lyric Leabu, who is also an actress.

Leabu made his debut playing the part of Jason White, Lois Lane's son, in the 2006 film Superman Returns. For this performance he won a 2007 Young Artist Award for Best Performance in a Feature Film – Supporting Young Actor and was nominated for Best Performance by a Younger Actor at the 2007 Saturn Awards. He appeared in the 2007 Lifetime movie While the Children Sleep. He played Reed Hellstrom on The Young and the Restless. Leabu is a musician and member of the Los Angeles-based alternative rock band Balto.

Filmography

Awards and nominations

References

External links

Living people
American male child actors
21st-century American male actors
American male soap opera actors
American people of Romanian descent
American people of Scandinavian descent
1999 births